Phalkot is one of the 57 Union Councils of Abbottabad District in the North-West Frontier Province of Pakistan.

Location 
Janderbari
It is some 25 km away from Abbottabad city towards the north-east.
Subdivisions:
The Union Council is subdivided into four village councils Janderbari, Phalkot, Kutli - Sehana and Malsa, that include other settlements including Kutli Sehana Buni Gali and Upri Kutli.   Janderbari is the main  village in UC having population of more than 15,000 people other vaccinates are Malsa,  Kutli & Sehana. Major cast is AWAN, whereas some Karlal are also resident in this UC. Major tribes are Baksial, Jalwan, Saghwal, Fekral, Langral, Bhadral, and Pirwaal.

Hindko is widely spoken throughout the area, Urdu being national language also spoken and understood. Most people are educated and the literacy ratio is around 85%

Tribes
Most of the people are from the Awan tribe, but there are also other tribes in UC Phalkot.

References

Abbottabad District